Otto Hoogesteyn (11 January 1903 – 7 June 1966) was a Dutch swimmer. He competed in the men's 4 × 200 metre freestyle relay event at the 1924 Summer Olympics.

References

External links
 

1903 births
1966 deaths
Olympic swimmers of the Netherlands
Swimmers at the 1924 Summer Olympics
Sportspeople from Wiesbaden
Dutch male freestyle swimmers
20th-century Dutch people